Kappa Volantis, Latinized from κ Volantis, is a quadruple star system in the southern constellation of Volans. The primary component has an apparent visual magnitude of 5.37, while the secondary companion is magnitude 5.65; individually, both a bright enough to be faintly visible to the naked eye. Based upon parallax measurements, the stars appear to be around 420−430 light-years from the Sun.

Properties 
The brightest component, κ1 Volantis, is a blue-white B-type star with a stellar classification showing characteristics of a both a subgiant and giant star. It has an unseen companion, and the pair form a single-lined spectroscopic binary. The star has nearly three times the Sun's mass, and 3.8 times its radius.

Companion 
Separated from κ1 Volantis by 65 arcseconds, κ2 Volantis is a white subgiant star that falls between a B-type and A-type classification. The system's fourth component, κ Volantis C, is a magnitude +8.5 star 37.7 arcseconds away from κ2 Volantis.

References

B-type giants
A-type subgiants
4
Volans (constellation)
Volantis, Kappa
Durchmusterung objects
040817
071046
3301